This is a list of films by the American actor, comedian, and filmmaker Buster Keaton.

Short films

Starring Roscoe Arbuckle, featuring Buster Keaton

Starring Buster Keaton under Buster Keaton Productions

Starring Buster Keaton for Educational Pictures

Starring Buster Keaton for Columbia Pictures

Starring Buster Keaton for independent producers

Directed by (but not featuring) Buster Keaton for Metro-Goldwyn-Mayer

With Buster Keaton in featured or cameo roles

Feature films

Starring Buster Keaton for Metro Pictures

Starring Buster Keaton under Buster Keaton Productions

Starring Buster Keaton for Metro-Goldwyn-Mayer

Starring Buster Keaton for independent producers

With Buster Keaton in featured or cameo roles

Television appearances (incomplete) 

 The Ed Wynn Show, (1949) as Buster
 The Buster Keaton Show, KKTV (1950) as Buster
 Life with Buster Keaton, KKTV (1951) as Buster
 Douglas Fairbanks Presents, episode "The Awakening" (1954) as The Man
 Screen Directors Playhouse, episode "The Silent Partner" (1955) as Kelsey Dutton
 The Rosemary Clooney Show, (1956) as Keystone Policeman
 Circus Time, Buster Keaton (1957)
What's My Line? 09/01/1957 (Episode # 378) (Season 9, Ep 1) as Mystery Guest
The Donna Reed Show (1957) episode "A Very Merry Christmas" as Charlie
 Milky Way, Buster Keaton TV Commercial (1961)
 The Twilight Zone, episode "Once Upon a Time" (1961) as Woodrow Mulligan the Janitor
 Candid Camera, episode "In the Diner" (1962)
 The Scene Stealers, Buster Keaton and Ed Wynn (1962).
Route 66, in "Journey to Nineveh" (1962) as Jonah Butler, the town jinx
 Mr. Smith Goes to Washington, in episode "Think Mink" (1963) as Si Willis
 Cleopatra Skit, (1964) Buster Keaton on Hollywood Palace
 Burke's Law, (1964) 
 Buster Keaton and Lucille Ball, in comedy to salute Stan Laurel (1965) as Buster
 Alka Seltzer, TV advertisement
 Ford Van, TV advertisement, (1966) as Buster

References

External links 

Filmography
Director filmographies
Male actor filmographies
American filmographies